Limiters of the Infinity Pool is the third studio album by Filipino alternative rock band Pupil, released on January 21, 2011. It was the band's last album released through Sony Music Philippines as the latter closed shop the following year.

Accolades

Track listing

References

2011 albums
Tagalog-language albums
Pupil (band) albums